Sumner Peter Mills Jr. (August 26, 1911 – September 22, 2001) was an American attorney and politician from Maine. He is the father of Governor Janet Mills and State Senator Sumner Peter Mills III.

Early life and education
Mills was born on August 26, 1911 in Farmington, Maine to Sumner Peter Mills and the former Flora Pearson. He attended Hebron Academy, Colby College, and Boston University School of Law.

References

External links

1911 births
2001 deaths
Boston University School of Law alumni
Colby College alumni
Maine lawyers
United States Attorneys for the District of Maine
20th-century American lawyers